Arvydas Janonis (born 6 November 1960, in Kėdainiai) is a former Lithuanian footballer.

Janonis played as a defender from 1978 until 1990 for FK Žalgiris Vilnius. The 1990/91 season he was part of the FC Lokomotiv Moscow squad.  In 1991, he moved to Austria where he played for SKN St. Pölten (1991–1994), Wiener Sport-Club (1994–1995), SV Gerasdorf (1995–1997) and SV Wurmla (1997–2000).

He represented the Soviet Union at the 1987 Summer Universiade and the 1988 Olympics, both won by the Soviet team. He also capped three times for the Lithuanian soccer team.

References

1960 births
Living people
Lithuanian footballers
Lithuania international footballers
Soviet footballers
FK Žalgiris players
FC Lokomotiv Moscow players
Olympic footballers of the Soviet Union
Olympic gold medalists for the Soviet Union
Footballers at the 1988 Summer Olympics
Association football defenders
Olympic medalists in football
Sportspeople from Kėdainiai
Medalists at the 1988 Summer Olympics
Wiener Sport-Club players